The I. Česky Lawn Tennis Klub Praha is a tennis club located on Štvanice Island in the center of Prague, Czech Republic.  The club was founded in 1893.  The current stadium seats 8,000 spectators, and was built to host the 1986 Federation Cup.  The club is the home of the I.ČLTK Prague Open, an annual event on the ITF Women's Circuit and the ATP Challenger Series.

External links
English site

Tennis venues in the Czech Republic
Sports venues in Prague